A list of films produced by the Israeli film industry in 2007.

2007 releases

Awards

Notable deaths

 8 July – Itzik Kol, Israeli film producer - pneumonia. (b. 1932)
 30 October – Yisrael Poliakov, Israeli actor, member of comedy group HaGashash HaHiver - cancer. (b. 1941)

See also
2007 in Israel

References

External links
 Israeli films of 2007 at the Internet Movie Database

Israeli
Film
2007